ITA Award for Best Actor in a Supporting Role is an award given by Indian Television Academy Awards as a part of its annual event for TV serials, to recognize a male actor who has delivered an outstanding performance in a Supporting Role.

Winners

References 

best actor supporting
Television awards for Best Actor